The Men's under-23 time trial of the 2019 UCI Road World Championships was a cycling event that took place on 24 September 2019 in Yorkshire, England. It was the 24th edition of the event, for which Danish rider Mikkel Bjerg was the two-time defending champion, having won in 2017 and 2018.

Bjerg became the first rider ever to win a third under-23 world time trial title, finishing 26.45 seconds clear of his closest competitor, Ian Garrison from the US. with the podium completed by Brandon McNulty, just 1.24 seconds behind Garrison.

Qualification
All National Federations were allowed to enter four riders for the race, with a maximum of two riders to start. In addition to this number, the outgoing World Champion and the current continental champions were also able to take part.

Continental and defending World champions

Final classification 
59 of the 61 qualified riders completed the 30.3-kilometre course.

References

Men's under-23 time trial
UCI Road World Championships – Men's under-23 time trial
2019 in men's road cycling